Joël MacKenzie Díaz (born 20 October 1979) is a Cuban male weightlifter, competing in the 105 kg category and representing Cuba at international competitions. He participated at the 2000 Summer Olympics in the 85 kg event. He competed at world championships, most recently at the 2007 World Weightlifting Championships.

Major results

References

1979 births
Living people
Cuban male weightlifters
Weightlifters at the 2000 Summer Olympics
Olympic weightlifters of Cuba
Sportspeople from Camagüey
Weightlifters at the 1999 Pan American Games
Weightlifters at the 2003 Pan American Games
Weightlifters at the 2007 Pan American Games
Pan American Games gold medalists for Cuba
Pan American Games medalists in weightlifting
Medalists at the 2007 Pan American Games
21st-century Cuban people